Ligusticum (lovage, licorice root) is a genus of about 60 species of flowering plants in the family Apiaceae, native to cool temperate regions of the Northern Hemisphere. Its name is believed to derive from the Italian region of Liguria.

Species
Ligusticum ajanense
Ligusticum albanicum
Ligusticum apiifolium 
Ligusticum brachylobum
Ligusticum calderi 
Ligusticum californicum 
Ligusticum canadense 
Ligusticum canbyi - Canby's licorice root
Ligusticum filicinum 
Ligusticum gingidium
Ligusticum grayi - oshala, Gray's lovage
Ligusticum holopetalum
Ligusticum hultenii
Ligusticum huteri
Ligusticum ibukicola
Ligusticum jeholense
Ligusticum monnieri
Ligusticum mutellina – alpine lovage
Ligusticum porteri – oshá
Ligusticum scoticum – Scots lovage 
Ligusticum sinense – gaoben 藁本
Ligusticum striatum - Szechuan lovage, Szechwan lovage, chuanxiong, chuan xiong 川芎
Ligusticum tenuifolium – Idaho lovage
Ligusticum vaginatum
Ligusticum verticillatum – northern lovage

Former species
Ligusticum mutellinoides – small alpine lovage, is a synonym of Neogaya simplex (L.) Meisn.

Uses
The roots of several species are used as medicinal herbs. L. striatum (in older literature L. wallichi or L. chuanxiong) is one of the 50 fundamental herbs used in Chinese herbology, where it is called chuānxiōng (川芎); in English, Szechwan lovage. L. porteri (osha) is used in Western herbal medicine. Chinese Ligusticum root contains alkaloids that have been shown in studies to inhibit TNF-alpha production and TNF-alpha-mediated NF-kappaB activation. One study conducted in Japan showed the active compounds found in Ligusticum sinense have both anti-inflammatory and pain-reducing effects, exerting its anti-inflammatory benefits in the early and the late stages of processes in the inflammatory pathology.

Both Ligusticum sinense and L. jeholens essential oils contain natural antimicrobial and 
antioxidant agents.

References

 
Flora of North America
Apioideae genera